A bender tent is a simple shelter. A bender is made using flexible branches or withies, such as those of hazel or willow. These are lodged in the ground, then bent and woven together to form a strong dome-shape. The dome is then covered using any tarpaulin available. These tents can be heated during the winter using a woodburning stove, and they are easily capable of withstanding very strong winds so long as the covers are well weighed down.

Background
The origin of the bender cannot be ascribed to any particular ethnic group. The mat tents used by Tuareg nomads are very similar to them, and like structures are commonplace throughout sub-saharan Africa. They were used by Romanies in Europe until very recently, and in the UK were revived for a while by New Age Travellers.

External links
Images of Travellers' lifestyle - Building a Bender tent Devon County Council.
Image "Family living in a bender circa 1930" p30 'The Forest Bus Mobile Project'.
Sketches from book Gypsy witchcraft and magic 
Difference between Pole Tents and Frame Tents: Pros and Cons

Tents
Camping equipment
African architecture
Vernacular architecture